Didymaea is a genus of flowering plants in the family Rubiaceae. The genus is found from Mexico to Central America.

Species
Didymaea alsinoides (Cham. & Schltdl.) Standl. - Mexico
Didymaea ixtepejiensis Borhidi & E.Martinez - Oaxaca
Didymaea linearis Standl. - Jalisco
Didymaea mexicana Hook.f. - Mexico, Costa Rica, El Salvador, Guatemala, Honduras, Nicaragua, Panama
Didymaea naniflora Borhidi & E.Martinez - Oaxaca

References

External links
Didymaea in the World Checklist of Rubiaceae

Rubiaceae genera
Rubieae
Taxa named by Joseph Dalton Hooker